Cedric Dubler (born 13 January 1995) is an Australian decathlete.

Early years 
As a young boy, Dubler was good at basketball, volleyball and soccer. At Little Athletics, he excelled at every type of event including 800m, long jump and sprints and cross-country. Dubler joined coach Eric Brown who trained him on the pole vault and Brown soon realised that Dubler was a potential decathlete.

When only 17 years of age, Dubler was placed an amazing fourth at the 2012 World U20 Championships. Two years later he won silver at the IAAF U20 World Junior Championships in Eugene, setting a former Oceania Junior Record of 8094 points. He was one of Australia's finest ever junior decathlete together with his training partner Ash Moloney.

Achievements 
In 2016, Dubler qualified for the Rio 2016 Olympics.  Dubler competed as Australia's first decathlete in 16 years at the 2016 Summer Olympics in Rio de Janeiro, placing 14th. He was the first Australian since Sydney 2000 to compete at the Games and moved up to number three Australian all-time with a score of 8024, after qualifying with 8114 points.

In 2017, Dubler defended his national title and was placed 18th at the 2017 IAAF World Championships.  

Dubler continued to make improvements in the 110m hurdles, discus and pole vault and at the National Championships and Commonwealth Games trials he achieved PBs in the 100m, shot, 110m hurdles, pole vault, javelin and 1500m.

At the 2020 Tokyo Olympic Games, Dubler gained admiration for sacrificing his own final 1500m leg of the decathlon to act as a ‘pacer’ and motivator for Ashley Moloney. Dubler's selflessness was acknowledged by many commentators as being instrumental in Moloney's bronze medal win, and was lauded by the Australian media as one of the most memorable moments of the Tokyo Olympics. On 30 April 2022, International Olympic Committee (IOC) President Thomas Bach presented Dubler with the inaugural Cecil Healy Award for Outstanding Sportsmanship displayed at an Olympic Games.

Personal bests

Major competition record

References

External links
 
 Cedric Dubler at Athletics Australia
 Cedric Dubler at Australian Athletics Historical Results
 
 
 
 
 
 

1995 births
Living people
Australian decathletes
Olympic athletes of Australia
Athletes (track and field) at the 2016 Summer Olympics
Commonwealth Games medallists in athletics
Commonwealth Games bronze medallists for Australia
Athletes (track and field) at the 2018 Commonwealth Games
People educated at Brisbane State High School
Athletes (track and field) at the 2020 Summer Olympics
20th-century Australian people
21st-century Australian people
Medallists at the 2018 Commonwealth Games